Egon Kornauth (14 May 1891 – 28 October 1959) was an Austrian composer and music teacher.

Life 
Kornauth was born in Olmütz, Moravia. A cellist and pianist from his youth, he went in 1909 to Vienna, where he studied with Robert Fuchs, Guido Adler, Franz Schreker (with whom he quarrelled) and Franz Schmidt.

After teaching music theory at Vienna University from 1919, Kornauth embarked on an international career as pianist, accompanist and conductor that took him to Indonesia (1926-9) and to South America (1934-5). In 1940 he resumed a teaching career in war-time Vienna and Salzburg. He joined the Nazi-sponsored Reichsmusikkammer, but continued to support his teacher Adler, who was held under house arrest as a Jew, until the latter's death in 1941. In post-war Austria, Kornauth became director of the Salzburg Mozarteum (1946-7), and was elected to the Austrian Arts Senate in 1954. He died in Vienna in 1959.

Kornauth composed extensively and won a number of prizes including the Austrian State Prize (1913) (for his Viola Sonata op.3), the Gustav Mahler Foundation prize (1919), and the Austrian Würdigungspreis (1951). His style was however conventional; when the English composer Humphrey Searle visited Vienna in the 1930s he was displeased to find that the only modern music played by the main orchestras was that of Schmidt  "or lesser composers like ... Kornauth." Kornauth himself recognised in his 1958 autobiography that "epigonism was inherent in my personality." Most of Kornauth's output consists of lieder, chamber music and piano pieces, but there are also five orchestral suites amongst other larger scale pieces.

A recording of some of Kornauth's piano works by Jonathan Powell was released by Toccata Classics in 2013.

Selected works
Orchestral
 Orchestral Suite No. 1 (Sinfonische Suite Nr. 1) Aus der Jugendzeit, Op. 7 (1913; revised 1928)
 Elegie auf den Tod eines Freundes (Elegy on the Death of a Friend) (1916); published 1932
 Sinfonische Ouvertüre (Symphonic Overture), Op. 13
 Orchestral Suite No. 2, Op. 20 (published 1925)
 Musik for string orchestra, Op. 25a (1920); after the String Sextet
 Orchestral Suite No. 3 (Sinfonische Suite Nr. 2), Op. 35 (1931; revised 1937); also for Piano Quintet, Op. 35a
 Orchestral Suite No. 5 Romantische Suite, Op. 40 (1936)
 Orchestral Suite No. 4 (Sinfonische Suite Nr. 4), Op. 42 (1938)
 Irish Tune from County Derry for string orchestra (or string quintet)

Concertante
 Notturno (Andante) for viola and chamber orchestra, Op. 3b (1912); movement II from the Viola Sonata
 Ballade for cello and orchestra, Op. 17 (1917)
 Konzertstück (Concert Piece) for violin and chamber orchestra (or piano), Op. 19 (1917)

Chamber music
 Sonata in C minor for viola and piano, Op. 3 (1912); also for clarinet and piano (1914); movement II, Notturno, also for viola and chamber orchestra
 Sonata for clarinet and piano, Op. 5
 2 Vortragsstücke: Scherzo und Andante (2 Concert Pieces) for violin and piano, Op. 5b (published 1932)
 Sonata in E minor for violin and piano, Op. 9 (1914)
 Burleske in E minor for flute and piano (or orchestra), Op. 11 (1916)
 Kleine Abendmusik for 2 violins, viola and cello, Op. 14 (1915)
 Sonata (Sonatina) in D major for violin and piano, Op. 15 (1916)
 Piano Quartet in C minor, Op. 18 (1917)
 String Sextet in A minor for 2 violins, 2 violas and 2 cellos, Op. 25 (1918–1919); also for string orchestra
 String Quartet in G minor, Op. 26 (1920)
 Piano Trio in B minor, Op. 27 (1921)
 Sonata for cello and piano, Op. 28 (published 1924)
 String Quintet for 2 violins, 2 violas and cello, Op. 30 (1923)
 Kammermusik (Chamber Music), Nonet for flute, oboe, clarinet, horn, 2 violins, viola, cello and double bass, Op. 31 (1924); for wind quintet and string quartet, Op. 31a (1924); Dectet for wind and string quintets, Op. 31b
 Klarinettenquintett (Clarinet Quintet) in F minor for clarinet, 2 violins, viola and cello, Op. 33 (1930)
 Piano Quintet in F minor, Op. 35a (1931); after the Orchestral Suite No. 3
 Kleine Hausmusik (Little Chamber Music; Petite composition facile) for 2 violins, viola and cello, Op. 41a (1939); also for piano, Op. 41b
 Trio-Suite for violin, cello (or viola) and piano, Op. 45 (1948)
     Rhapsodie
     Valse triste
     Canon I
     Canon II
     Canzonetta
 Valse triste for viola and piano (1948); from Trio-Suite, Op. 45
 Sonatina for violin (or flute, or viola) and piano, Op. 46 (1952)
 3 Stücke (3 Pieces) for cello (or viola) and piano, Op. 47 (1954)
     Elegie
     Romanze
     Dumka
 Irish Tune from County Derry for string quintet (or string orchestra)

Piano
 5 Klavierstücke (5 Piano Pieces), Op. 2 (1912)
 Sonata in A major, Op. 4 (1912)
 Fantasie (Phantasie), Op. 10 (1915)
 3 Klavierstücke (3 Piano Pieces), Op. 23 (1920); also for piano 4-hands, Op. 23a
     Präludium
     Improvisation
     Walzer
 Kleine Suite (Little Suite), Op. 29 (1923)
     Präludium
     Intermezzo
     Barcarole
     Ländler
     Notturno
     Walzer
     Finale
 4 Klavierstücke (4 Piano Pieces), Op. 32 (1926); also for piano 4-hands, Op. 32a
     In Memoriam
     Capriccio
     Notturno
     Rondo-Burleske
 Präludium und Passacaglia (Prelude and Passacaglia), Op. 43 (1939)
 5 Klavierstücke (5 Piano Pieces), Op. 44 (1940)
     Präludium
     Intermezzo
     Capriccio
     Mährische Ballade
     Walzer
 3 Canons (published 1951)

Vocal
 6 Lieder (6 Songs) for voice and piano, Op. 1 (1911); Nos. 1, 4 and 6 also for voice and chamber orchestra
     Ganz im Geheimen; words by Franz von Königsbrun-Schaup
     Landsknechtlied; words by Heinrich von Reder
     Leid; words by Maria Stona
     Frühlingsruhe; words by Ludwig Uhland
     Mein und Dein; words by J. G. Fischer
     In der Kirschenblüth'; words by J. G. Fischer
 Erntelied von anno 1914 for medium voice and piano (1914); words by Richard Smekal
4 Gesänge (4 Songs) for high voice and piano, Op. 8 (1914); also for voice and chamber orchestra
     Zu spät; words by Friedrich Theodor Vischer
     Traumleben; words by Julius Hart
     O gib mir nicht den Mund!; words by Ernst Goll
     Der stille Tag; words by Robert Hohlbaum
 8 Gesänge nach Richard Smekal (8 Songs after Richard Smekal) for high or medium voice and piano, Op. 12 (1916); words by Richard Smekal; Nos. 2, 3, 4, 6, 7 and 8 also for voice and chamber orchestra
     Nächtliche Fahrt
     Schnitterspruch
     Versunkenheit
     Brief am Abend
     Ringelreihen im Frühling
     Liebeselegie
     Abendlied in der großen Stadt
     Maiwanderung
 6 Lieder (6 Songs) for medium voice and piano, Op. 21 (1918); also for voice and chamber orchestra
     Schließe mir die Augen beide; words by Theodor Storm
     Lied in die Ferne; words by Richard Smekal
     Du; words by Ricarda Huch
     Aus den Frühen Gedichten von Rainer Maria Rilke I: Bange Erwartung; words by Rainer Maria Rilke
     Aus den Frühen Gedichten von Rainer Maria Rilke II: Nachtwind; words by Rainer Maria Rilke
     Abendlied; words by Albrecht Schaeffer
 6 Lieder nach Hermann Hesse (6 Songs after Hermann Hesse) for medium voice and piano, Op. 22 (1918); words by Hermann Hesse; Nos. 1~5 also for voice and chamber orchestra; No. 5 also with string orchestra
     Im Grase hingestreckt
     Böse Zeit
     Oktober
     Im Nebel
     Drüben
     Die leise Wolke
 Welt der Zyklamen for voice and piano, Op. 24 No. 3
 4 Lieder nach Brentano (4 Songs after Brentano) for high voice and piano, Op. 34 (1931); words by Clemens Brentano; No. 1 also for high voice, solo flute and string orchestra; Nos. 2 and 3 also for voice and chamber orchestra
     Abendständchen
     Der Spinnerin Lied
     Wiegenlied
     Säusle, liebe Myrthe
 Schwanenlied for high voice and piano, Op. 34b; words by Clemens Brentano
 8 Lieder nach Eichendorff (8 Songs after Eichendorff) for low voice and piano, Op. 36 (1932); words by Joseph Freiherr von Eichendorff; No. 1 also for voice and chamber orchestra
     Der Einsiedler
     Nachts I
     Erinnerung
     Der Abend
     Nachts II
     Sterbeglocken
     Herbstweh
     Abschied
 6 Lieder nach Eichendorff (6 Songs after Eichendorff) for high voice and piano, Op. 37 (1932); words by Joseph Freiherr von Eichendorff
     Lockung
     Treue
     Nachklänge I
     Waldeinsamkeit
     Die Nachtigallen
     Herbst
 8 Lieder nach Eichendorff (8 Songs after Eichendorff) for medium-high voice and piano, Op. 38 (1933); words by Joseph Freiherr von Eichendorff; Nos. 4 and 8 also for voice and chamber orchestra
     Im Alter
     Die Nacht
     Am Strom
     Winternacht
     Nachtwanderer
     Seliges Vergeßen
     Nachklänge II
     Valet

Choral
 Gesang der späten Linden for female chorus and chamber orchestra (or piano quintet), Op. 16 (revised 1933); words by Richard Smekal
 Der Abend for female chorus, flute, clarinet and string quartet, Op. 34a (1931); words by Clemens Brentano
 [2 Choruses], Op. 39 (1933); words by Friedrich Hölderlin
     Lied der Freundschaft for male chorus a cappella
     Lied der Liebe for mixed chorus a cappella

References
Citations

Sources
 Gruber, Gerold W. (n.d.). "Kornauth, Egon" in Oxford Music Online , accessed 4 April 2014.
 Powell, Jonathan (2013). "Egon Kornauth Piano Works , Volume One." Essay in booklet accompanying CD of the same title, Toccata Classics, TOCC 0159.

External links 

1891 births
1959 deaths
Musicians from Olomouc
Austrian classical composers
Austrian pianists
Austrian music educators
Male conductors (music)
20th-century classical composers
20th-century Austrian conductors (music)
20th-century Austrian male musicians
Austrian male classical composers
20th-century pianists
Male pianists
Moravian-German people
Austrian people of Moravian-German descent